František Antonín Nickerl (December 4, 1813 in Prague – February 4, 1871 in Prague) was a Czech entomologist who specialised in Lepidoptera, especially those of the Riesengebirges.

František Nickerl was a professor of zoology in Graz and of natural history in Prague where he was also "Prof. Dr." of medicine. He was at some time  a research worker and curator at the National Museum in Prague.That institution conserves his insect collection.
He is not to be confused with Otokar Nickerl (1838–1920) also an entomologist.

Works
Nickerl, 1850. Synopsis der Lepidopteren-Fauna Bohmens. F. A. Nickerl. Prag. 1850.
many scientific papers in the Stettiner Entomologische Zeitung the journal of the Entomological Society of Stettin of which he was a Member.

References
Howard, L. O. 1930 History of applied Entomology (Somewhat Anecdotal) Smiths. Miscell. Coll. 84 X+1-564.
Koleška, Z. 1975 Historie entomologického průzkumu Krkonoš. Opera Corcontica 12 137–151, zahlr. Portrait.
Osborn, H. 1952 A Brief History of Entomology Including Time of Demosthenes and Aristotle to Modern Times with over Five *Hundred Portraits. -Columbus, Ohio, The Spahr & Glenn Company : 1–303.
Stepánek, O. 1975 150 let Zoologie Národního Muzea v Praze. Čas. Narod. Muz., Řada Přirodov. 138–139

External links
Franz Anton Nickerl

Czech entomologists
Czech lepidopterists
1813 births
1871 deaths
Scientists from Prague